The 2018 Pennzoil 400 was a Monster Energy NASCAR Cup Series race held on March 4, 2018, at Las Vegas Motor Speedway in Las Vegas. Contested over 267 laps on the  asphalt intermediate speedway, it was the third race of the 2018 Monster Energy NASCAR Cup Series season.

Report

Background

Las Vegas Motor Speedway, located in Clark County, Nevada outside the Las Vegas city limits and about 15 miles northeast of the Las Vegas Strip, is a  complex of multiple tracks for motorsports racing. The complex is owned by Speedway Motorsports, Inc., which is headquartered in Charlotte, North Carolina.

Entry list

First practice

Qualifying

Qualifying results

Practice (post-qualifying)

Second practice

Final practice

Race

First stage

Start 
Ryan Blaney led the field to the green flag at 3:46 p.m. Blaney led a total of one lap, and Kevin Harvick took the lead on lap 2, and led 37 laps, but then Michael McDowell took the lead on lap 39 and led 11 laps, and Kevin Harvick regained the lead on lap 49 and led the 80-lap first stage. He finished 3.6 seconds in front of Martin Truex Jr., leading 68 of the 80 laps. Also in the top five were Kyle Larson, Ryan Blaney and Joey Logano. The first caution of the race flew for conclusion of stage 1.

Second stage 
The race restarted on lap 89, Kyle Busch took the lead on lap 122, and led 4 laps, but then Kevin Harvick regained the lead on lap 126 and dominated the race in its second stage, winning by 5.3 seconds over Ryan Blaney. Following were Kyle Larson, Joey Logano and Kyle Busch. Harvick led 76 of the stage’s 80 laps. The second caution of the race flew for conclusion of stage 2.

Final stage 

The race restarted on lap 167, and it remained green for 10 laps. The third caution of the race flew on lap 176 after Jamie McMurray slapped the outside wall. He parked his Chevrolet.

The race restarted on lap 183 and the fourth caution of the race flew when Kurt Busch lost control of his car in heavy traffic with 84 laps to go and slid up the track into Chase Elliott and into the wall. Both cars suffered heavy damage.

The race restarted on lap 195. Harvick drove on to score his third career victory and second at Las Vegas.

Post race 
“I know how hard it is to get to victory lane, and to know we have been there 100 times is something I almost can't fathom,” Harvick said.

Stage Results

Stage 1
Laps: 80

Stage 2
Laps: 80

Final Stage Results

Stage 3
Laps: 107

Race statistics
 11 lead changes among 6 different drivers
 4 cautions for 29 laps
 Time of race: 2 hours, 49 minutes and 31 seconds
 Average speed: 
 Margin of victory: 2.906 seconds

Media

Television
Fox Sports covered their 18th race at the Las Vegas Motor Speedway. Mike Joy, 2001 race winner Jeff Gordon and Darrell Waltrip called from the booth for the race. Jamie Little, Vince Welch and Matt Yocum handled the pit road duties for the television side.

Radio
PRN covered the radio call for the race which was also simulcasted on Sirius XM NASCAR Radio. Doug Rice, Mark Garrow and Wendy Venturini called the race in the booth when the field raced through the tri-oval. Rob Albright called the race from a billboard in turn 2 when the field raced through turns 1 and 2. Pat Patterson called the race from a billboard outside of turn 3 when the field raced through turns 3 and 4. Brad Gillie, Brett McMillan, Jim Noble and Steve Richards worked pit road for the radio side.

Penalties
On March 7, 2018, NASCAR assessed the Stewart-Haas Racing No. 4 Ford an L1 penalty for violating sections 20.4.8.1 (dealing with rear window support) and 20.4.18 (rocker panel extensions). A brace that supports the rear window failed and did not meet specifications for keeping the rear window glass rigid in all directions, at all times. Additionally, the rocker panel extension was not aluminum. The team would be docked 20 driver and owner points, the win would not count toward playoffs, crew chief Rodney Childers was fined $50,000 and car chief Robert Smith would be suspended for the next two races.
Additionally, the No. 55 team was penalized for a loose lug nut during inspection and crew chief Todd Parrott was fined $10,000.

Standings after the race

Drivers' Championship standings

Manufacturers' Championship standings

Note: Only the first 16 positions are included for the driver standings.

References

2018 in sports in Nevada
2018 Monster Energy NASCAR Cup Series
March 2018 sports events in the United States
NASCAR races at Las Vegas Motor Speedway